The E6 European long distance path or E6 path is one of the European long-distance paths from the northwest tip of Finland through Sweden, Denmark, Germany and Austria to the Adriatic coast in Slovenia.  A second section starts again in Greece to finish in Turkey.

Finland 
Responsible organisation: None

European Ramblers' Association doesn’t take the responsibility for E6 in Finland, because of no ERA Member Organisation in this country.

Some of the places passed on the north-to-south route include:
 Kilpisjärvi, Finland
 Kemi, Finland
 Tampere, Finland
 Turku, Finland
 Mariehamn, Finland

Sweden 
Responsible organisation: Svenska Turistforeningen

Some of the places passed on the north-to-south route include:
 Grisslehamn, Sweden (reached by ferry)
 Stockholm, Sweden
 the lake country of S Sweden
 Malmö, Sweden

Denmark 
Responsible organisation: Dansk Vandrelaug

Route

The E-path starts in Kastrup Airport in Copenhagen and follows the southern side of Copenhagen towards Roskilde.

An alternate E6 starts in Helsingør and follows Nordsjællandsruten to Roskilde. It goes through North Zealand and passes nationalpark Kongernes Nordsjælland.

From Roskilde the E-path follows partly the trail Skjoldungestien to Ringsted.
From Ringsted to Korsør the E-path follows its own track.
In Korsør you take the train over Great Belt to Nyborg, where the E-path continues south towards Svendborg, where it follows the trail Øhavsstien on the southern part of Fyn.
Take the ferry from Svendborg to Ærøskøbing on the island Ærø and continue along Øhavsstien to Søby.
Take the ferry from Søby to Fynshav, where you continue south to meet the Leading Quality Trail Gendarmstien.
Follow Gendarmstien, passing Sønderborg and Gråsten towards Kruså.

The E-path is well documented on Waymarked Trails

The E-path is not well marked on Fyn !

External links
European Ramblers Association data on E6 in Denmark

Germany 

Responsible organisation: Deutsche Wanderverband

Some of the places passed on the north-to-south route include:

 Kiel, Germany
 Lübeck, Germany
 Fichtelgebirge, Germany
 Dreisesselberg, Germany

Austria 
In Austria the E6 follows the routes of Nordwaldkammweg (from Dreisesselberg to Nebelstein) and Nord-Süd-Weitwanderweg 05 (North-South-Trail) to Eibiswald near the Slovenian border.

Some of the places passed on the north-to-south route include:

 Upper Austria:
 Bad Leonfelden
 Freistadt
 Lower Austria:
 Nebelstein
 Spitz an der Donau (200 m, lowest point in Austria)
 Melk
 Lackenhof / Ötscher
 Styria:
 Mariazell
 Hochschwab (2277 m, highest point in Austria)
 Leoben
 Gleinalpe
 Koralpe
 Eibiswald

External links
European Ramblers Association data on E6 in Austria

Slovenia 
Some of the places passed on the north-to-south route include:
 Radlje ob Dravi
 Koper
 Strunjan

Greece 
Some of the places passed on the north-to-south route include:
 Igoumenitsa, Greece
 Florina, Greece
 Alexandroupoli, Greece

Turkey 
Some of the places passed on the north-to-south route include:
 Dardanelles, Turkey

External links

 E6 at the European Ramblers' Association
 Waymarkedtrails.com
 Kommission for European Footpaths in Slovenia
 Interactive map of E6 in Slovenia (Slovene language)

Hiking trails in Germany
European long-distance paths
Hiking trails in Slovenia
Hiking trails in Sweden